The 1878 United States elections occurred in the middle of Republican President Rutherford B. Hayes's term, during the Third Party System. It was the first election following the end of the Reconstruction Era, and Redeemers had gained back control of most Southern governments following the Compromise of 1877. Members of the 46th United States Congress were chosen in this election. Democrats won control of the Senate for the first time since the start of the Civil War. Democrats lost a majority in the House, but retained a plurality and control of the chamber.

In the House, Democrats and Republicans both lost seats to the Greenback Party and a group of independent Democrats, with the Democrats retaining only a plurality. Democrat Samuel J. Randall won re-election as Speaker of the House.

In the Senate, Democrats picked up several seats, taking control of the chamber for the first time since 1861.

See also
1878–79 United States House of Representatives elections
1878–79 United States Senate elections

References

1878 elections in the United States
1878
United States midterm elections